Lee Seung-gi (born 2 June 1988) is a South Korean football player who currently plays for Jeonbuk Hyundai Motors as a midfielder, having previously played for Gwangju FC. He also represents South Korea in senior men's football.

Club career 
Lee was selected by Gwangju FC as a draft pick from the University of Ulsan for the 2011 K-League season. After making his first appearance for his new club in the second round 2011 K-League Cup match on 6 April 2011 against Busan I'Park, he played his first K-League game the following week against Sangju Sangmu Phoenix, which ended in a draw. Lee scored his first professional goal in Gwangju's win over Daejeon Citizen on 1 May 2011. Lee would go on to score a further seven goals during the season, finishing as his club's joint top scorer for 2011 alongside João Paulo.

Gwangju were relegated following the completion of the 2012 K-League season. In January 2013, Lee transferred to Jeonbuk Hyundai Motors.

In 2015, Lee Seung-Gi moved the team Jeonbuk Hyundai Motors to Sangju Sangmu FC, because he was to enlist within 2 years. Also, he was supposed to return to Jeonbuk Hyundai Motors  in 2017.

International career
In 2011, Lee was selected in the Republic of Korea squad for the AFC third round of the qualification matches for the 2014 World Cup. He made his international debut as a substitute in Korea's win over the United Arab Emirates on 11 November 2011.

Career statistics

Club

Honours

Club 

Jeonbuk Hyundai Motors
K League 1: 2014, 2017, 2018, 2019, 2020
KFA Cup: 2020

Sangju Sangmu
K League 2: 2015

Individual 
 K League Young Player of the Year: 2011
 K League Top Assists Award: 2014
 K League 1 Best XI: 2014, 2017
 K League 2 Best XI: 2015
 Korean FA Cup Most Valuable Player: 2020

References

External links 

1988 births
Living people
Association football midfielders
South Korean footballers
South Korea international footballers
Gwangju FC players
Jeonbuk Hyundai Motors players
Gimcheon Sangmu FC players
K League 1 players
K League 2 players
Sportspeople from Gwangju